The  is a suburban electric multiple unit (EMU) train type operated by Shikoku Railway Company (JR Shikoku) in Shikoku, Japan, since 1996.

Design
The cars have stainless steel bodies and cab ends based on the 211 series/213 series design. The doors immediately behind the driving cabs are single-leaf instead of the pairs of doors used at other locations.

Operations
The sets are based at Takamatsu Depot, and operate on the Yosan Line and Dosan Line. Sets can run in multiple with single-car 7000 series EMU trailer cars to form 4-car sets.

Formations
The two 3-car sets are formed as shown below with the motored "Mc" cars at the Takamatsu end.

The "Mc" cars are each fitted with two lozenge-type pantographs.

Bogies
The motored 6000 cars are mounted on bolsterless S-DT62 bogies, and the non-powered 6100 and 6200 trailer cars are mounted on S-TR62 bogies.

Interior
Seating accommodation consists of transverse seating with backs that can be flipped over to face the direction of travel.

History
The two trains were delivered from Nippon Sharyo in March 1996, and entered revenue service on 26 April 1996.

References

Electric multiple units of Japan
6000 series
Train-related introductions in 1996
Nippon Sharyo multiple units
1500 V DC multiple units of Japan